Enteromius syntrechalepis is a species of ray-finned fish in the genus Enteromius which has only been recorded from the central Congo Basin in the Democratic Republic of the Congo.

Footnotes 

 

Enteromius
Taxa named by Henry Weed Fowler
Fish described in 1949